Dareshk or Dereshk may refer to:
 Dareshk, Kerman
 Dereshk, West Azerbaijan

See also
 Dareshak